Josef Chuchla (born June 27, 1973) is a Czech skeleton racer who competed from 1994 to 2003. He finished 24th in the men's skeleton event at the 2002 Winter Olympics in Salt Lake City.

Chuchla's best finish at the FIBT World Championships was 21st in the men's skeleton event at Calgary in 2001.

References
 2002 men's skeleton results
 FIBT profile
 Skeletonsport.com profile

External links
 

1973 births
Czech male skeleton racers
Living people
Skeleton racers at the 2002 Winter Olympics
Olympic skeleton racers of the Czech Republic